Dornröschen (Sleeping Beauty) is a 1902 opera by Engelbert Humperdinck. The libretto, based on the story of Sleeping Beauty, was by fairy tale writer Elisabeth Ebeling and Bertha Lehrmann-Filhés, with a dialogue version by Ralf Eger who worked on Franz Lehár's operettas such as Der Zarewitsch.

Premiere

Dornröschen premiered on 11 December 1902 at the Stadttheater in Frankfurt-am-Main, with Humperdinck conducting.

Principal roles with premiere cast members:

Recordings

Complete opera

 Dornröschen – Brigitte Fassbaender (speaking role, Dämonia, the wicked fairy), Christina Landshamer (Rosa, Queen of the fairies), Kristiane Kaiser (Sleeping Beauty), Tobias Haaks (Reinhold), Stephanie Hampl (Morphina), Anna Borchers (Quecksilber), Miriam Clark (the Sun), Brigitte Bayer (a forget-me-not), Guibee Yang (a rose), Wolfgang Klose (Vogt of the Ancestral Castle), Jerzy May (Ringold), Barbara Malisch (Armgart). Chor des Bayerischen Rundfunks and Muenchner Rundfunkorchester; Ulf Schirmer, conductor. CPO, 2011.

Incidental music

Märchenmusiken = Fairy-tale music - Hänsel und Gretel. Ouvertüre = Overture—Der blaue Vogel = The Blue Bird. Vorspiel : Der Weihnachtstraum = The Christmas Dream; Sternenreigen  -- Königskinder = The King's Children. Konzertouvertüre = Concert Overture; Einleitung zum 2. Akt = Act II: Introduction : Hellafest und Kinderreigen; Einleitung zum 3. Akt. = Act II: Introduction : Verdorben-Gestorben! -- Dornröschen. Vorspiel = Prelude; Ballade; Irrfahrten = Wanderings; Dornenschloss = The Thorn Castle; Festklänge = Festival Sounds. Bamberger Symphoniker; Karl Anton Rickenbacher, conductor. Virgin Classics, 1992.

References

Operas by Engelbert Humperdinck
Children's operas
Works based on Sleeping Beauty
Operas based on literature
Operas based on fairy tales
German-language operas
Operas
1902 operas